The blotched podge (Aporops bilinearis) is a species of marine ray-finned fish, related to the groupers and classified within the subfamily Epinephelinae of the family Serranidae. It is found in shallow water in reefs and it is a solitary and rather cryptic species. It is the only species in the genus Aporopos.

References

Grammistini
Fish described in 1943